Valea Dosului River may refer to:
 Valea Dosului, a tributary of the Bega Veche in Timiș County, Romania
 Dosul, a tributary of the Băiaș in Vâlcea County, Romania